Baker Farm may refer to:

 Baker Farm (Keedysville, Maryland) in Maryland
Millhiser-Baker Farm, Roswell, New Mexico
J. and E. Baker Cobblestone Farmstead, Macedon, New York
 Baker Farm (Bunn, North Carolina)
J. T. Baker Farmstead, Blum, TX, listed on the NRHP in Texas